Richard A. Baker (born December 8, 1950), known professionally as Rick Baker, is an American retired special make-up effects creator and actor. He is mostly known for his creature designs and effects. Baker won the Academy Award for Best Makeup a record seven times from a record eleven nominations, beginning when he won the inaugural award for the 1981 horror comedy film An American Werewolf in London.

Early life
Baker was born in Binghamton, New York, to Doris (née Hamlin), a bank teller, and Ralph B. Baker, a professional artist. He and his family moved to Covina, California when he was less than one year old.

Career
As a teenager, Baker began creating artificial body parts in his own kitchen. He also appeared briefly in the fan production The Night Turkey, a one-hour, black-and-white video parody of The Night Stalker (1972), directed by William Malone. Baker's first professional job was as an assistant to prosthetic makeup effects veteran Dick Smith on the 1973 film The Exorcist. While working on The Exorcist, Baker was hired by director Larry Cohen to design and create a mutant infant for Cohen's 1974 film It's Alive.

At the 54th Academy Awards, Baker received the inaugural Academy Award for Best Makeup for his work on An American Werewolf in London (1981). Subsequently, he has been nominated for Best Makeup ten more times, winning on seven occasions, both records in his field. Baker also created the werecat creature Michael Jackson transforms into in the music video Thriller (1983).

In 2008, he was awarded a Doctorate of Humane Letters from the Academy of Art University in San Francisco. Baker also contributes commentaries to the web series Trailers from Hell for trailers about horror and science fiction films. Baker claims that his work on Harry and the Hendersons (1987) is one of his proudest achievements, for which he won his second Oscar. On October 3, 2009, he received the Jack Pierce Lifetime Achievement Award at the Chiller-Eyegore Awards.

On November 30, 2012, Baker received the 2485th star of the Hollywood Walk of Fame. The star is located in front of the Guinness World Records Museum.

On May 28, 2015, Baker announced his retirement, saying: "First of all, the CG stuff definitely took away the animatronics part of what I do. It's also starting to take away the makeup part. The time is right, I am 64 years old, and the business is crazy right now. I like to do things right, and they wanted cheap and fast. That is not what I want to do, so I just decided it is basically time to get out. I would consider designing and consulting on something, but I don't think I will have a huge working studio anymore."

In 2018, Baker was approached by DC Comics, due to his daughter Veronica working for them at the time, if he would be interested in creating a collectible display bust for them. He agreed with the following terms that he would be left alone with total creative freedom and DC accepted them. Baker, with the aide of his long time mold maker Rob Freitas, created a bust of The Joker.

Acting roles
Baker played the title role in the 1976 remake of King Kong. In the 2005 remake, he had a cameo as the pilot and gunner (with director Peter Jackson) who shot down Kong. He has also made cameo appearances in: Michael Jackson's music video Thriller (1983) as "Zombie Opening the Crypt"; Into the Night (1985) as a drug dealer with a business card; Men in Black II (2002) as "MIB Passport Control Agent", an MIB agent helping provide aliens with disguises; Men in Black 3 (2012) as "Brain Alien"; The Wolfman (2010) as "Gypsy Man / First Killed"; and Rings (2017) as a flea market vendor.

Personal life
Baker is married; he was previously married to Elaine Melba Parkyn for ten years. He met his second wife, hairstylist Silvia Abascal, while they were both working on Into the Night (1985). Baker also has two daughters, Rebecca and Veronica.

Selected filmography

 Octaman (1971) (Octaman costume; co-created with Doug Beswick)
 The Thing with Two Heads (1972) (special effects - uncredited)
 Schlock (1973) (makeup artist / actor)
 The Exorcist (1973) (special effects assistant - uncredited)
 It's Alive (1974) (makeup artist / special makeup effects artist - uncredited)
 The Autobiography of Miss Jane Pittman (1974) (makeup creator: Miss Tyson)
 King Kong (1976) (makeup effects - uncredited / special contributions: Kong / actor)
 Track of the Moon Beast (1976) (makeup artist)
 Squirm (1976) (makeup designer)
 The Incredible Melting Man (1977) (special makeup effects / actor)
 Star Wars (1977) (makeup: second unit)
 The Fury (1978) (special makeup effects)
 The Empire Strikes Back (1980) (makeup artist - uncredited)
 An American Werewolf in London (1981) (special makeup effects designer and creator)
 The Howling (1981) (special makeup effects consultant)
 The Funhouse (1981) (special makeup design)
 The Incredible Shrinking Woman (1981) (creator and designer: Sidney / makeup effects / actor)
 Videodrome (1983) (special makeup effects designer)
 Thriller (1983) (special makeup effects designer and creator / actor)
 Greystoke: The Legend of Tarzan, Lord of the Apes (1984) (special makeup effects)
 Starman (1984) (Starman transformation)
 Into the Night (1985) (actor)
 My Science Project (1985) (special makeup effects artist - uncredited)
 Captain EO (1986) (special makeup effects)
 Ratboy (1986) (designer: Ratboy)
 Harry and the Hendersons (1987) (creature designer: Harry / puppeteer / makeup artist)
 Beauty and the Beast (1987–89) (designer and creator)
 Werewolf (1987–88) (werewolf characters designer)
 Coming to America (1988) (special makeup effects)
 Gorillas in the Mist (1988) (special makeup effects / associate producer)
 Missing Link (1988) (special makeup effects)
 Gremlins 2: The New Batch (1990) (special effects supervisor / co-producer)
 The Rocketeer (1991) (makeup creator: Lothar)
 Wolf (1994) (special makeup effects)
 Ed Wood (1994) (makeup creator: Bela Lugosi / makeup designer: Bela Lugosi)
 Batman Forever (1995) (special makeup designer and creator)
 The Nutty Professor (1996) (special makeup effects)
 The Frighteners (1996) (special makeup artist: The Judge)
 Escape from L.A. (1996) (special makeup effects)
 Ghosts (1997) (special makeup effects artist)
 Men in Black (1997) (alien makeup effects / special makeup effects artist)
 Critical Care (1997) (special makeup effects: Mr. Brooks)
 Mighty Joe Young (1998) (special makeup effects / creature designer and producer: Mighty Joe Young)
 Psycho (1998) (special makeup effects artist)
 Life (1999) (special makeup effects)
 Wild Wild West (1999) (special makeup effects)
 How the Grinch Stole Christmas (2000) (special makeup effects / actor)
 Nutty Professor II: The Klumps (2000) (special makeup effects)
 Planet of the Apes (2001) (makeup artist / special makeup effects designer and creator / actor)
 Men in Black II (2002) (alien makeup effects / special makeup effects artist - uncredited / actor)
 The Ring (2002) (special makeup effects artist)
 The Haunted Mansion (2003) (special makeup effects designer and creator)
 Hellboy (2004) (makeup consultant: Hellboy / special effects director)
 The Ring Two (2005) (special makeup effects artist)
 King Kong (2005) (actor)
 Cursed (2005) (special makeup effects artist / special makeup effects creator / special makeup effects designer)
 X-Men: The Last Stand (2006) (special makeup effects consultant)
 Click (2006) (special age makeup artist - uncredited / special makeup effects)
 Enchanted (2007) (special makeup effects artist)
 Norbit (2007) (special makeup effects artist)
 Tropic Thunder (2008) (makeup designer: Mr. Downey Jr.)
 The Wolfman (2010) (special makeup effects / actor)
 Tron: Legacy (2010) (special makeup effects artist)
 Men in Black 3 (2012) (alien makeup effects / actor)
 Maleficent (2014) (makeup designer: Maleficent)
 Rings (2017) (actor)

Awards and nominations

Academy Awards

BAFTA Awards

Saturn Awards

Other awards
 2485th star on the Hollywood Walk of Fame
 Time Machine Award at the 2015 Sitges Film Festival
 Doctorate of Humane Letters from the Academy of Art University
 Jack Pierce Lifetime Achievement Award at the Chiller-Eyegore Awards
 Inducted in the Monster Kid Hall of Fame at the Rondo Hatton Classic Horror Awards
 Primetime Emmy Award for Outstanding Achievement in Makeup for The Autobiography of Miss Jane Pittman (1974)

See also
 Prosthetic makeup
 Special effect

References

External links

 
 

1950 births
Living people
Academy of Art University alumni
American make-up artists
Artists from Binghamton, New York
Best Makeup Academy Award winners
Best Makeup BAFTA Award winners
People from Binghamton, New York
People from Covina, California
Special effects people